Paige Murney (born 21 January 1995 in Leicester) is a British amateur boxer who is affiliated with the Leicester Unity club.

She won a bronze medal in the 2017 European Union Championships.

In 2019 Murney was selected to compete at the World Championships in Ulan-Ude, Russia, where she lost by unanimous decision to Rimma Volossenko in the round of 32.

References

1995 births
Living people
English women boxers
Boxers from Leicester
Commonwealth Games medallists in boxing
Commonwealth Games silver medallists for England
Boxers at the 2018 Commonwealth Games
Lightweight boxers
Medallists at the 2018 Commonwealth Games